Pana Sankranti, also known as Maha Bishuba Sankranti, is the traditional new year day festival of Odia people in Odisha, India. The festival occurs in the solar Odia calendar (the lunisolar Hindu calendar followed in Odisha) on the first day of the traditional solar month of Meṣa, hence equivalent lunar month Baisakha. This falls on the Purnimanta system of the Indian Hindu calendar. It therefore falls on 13/14 April every year on the Gregorian calendar.

The festival is celebrated with visits to Shiva, Shakti or Hanuman temples. People take baths in rivers or major pilgrimage centers. Feasts and special drinks such as a chilled sweet mango-milk-yoghurt-coconut drink called  is shared, a tradition that partly is the source of this festival's name.

Pana Sankranti is related to new year festivals in South and Southeast Asian solar New Year as observed by Hindus and Buddhists elsewhere such as Vaisakhi (north and central India, Nepal), Bohag Bihu (Assam), Pohela Boishakh (Bengal), Puthandu (Tamil Nadu) etc.

Practices
In the Odia Hindu tradition, the Pana Sankranti is believed to be the birthday of the Hindu deity Hanuman, whose loving devotion  Rama (seventh incarnation of Vishnu) in Ramayana is legendary. His temples, along with those of Shiva and Surya (sun god) are revered on the new year.

Hindus also visit Devi (goddess) temples on Pana Sankranti. The temples include Taratarini Temple near Brahmapur, Odisha in Ganjam, Cuttack Chandi, Biraja Temple, Samaleswari temple and Sarala Temple. At Sarala Temple the priests walk on hot coals in the fire-walking festival, Jhaamu Yatra. At the Maa Patana Mangala Temple in Chhatrapada, Bhadrak, the Patua Yatra festival is held from 14 April to 21 April. In Northern Odisha, the festival is known as Chadak Parva. In Southern Odisha, the Meru Yatra festival is celebrated as the end of the month-long  dance festival. Thousands of devotees gather at the Shakti Pitha shrine in the Taratarini Temple because it is one of the auspicious days during the Chaitra Yatra.

The significance of the day is that the new Odia calendar or Panjika is also introduced which is an almanac of Hindu festivals and contains the dates of festivals, auspicious days and timings, timings of sunrise and sunset along with horoscopes for the year.

Bela Pana

People from all over the state eat festive Chhatua and drink Bela Pana to mark the occasion. The Bela Pana is prepared with Bael, milk, chhena, fruits, yoghurt, cashews, spices and sugar or jaggery.

Basundhara theki

An important ritual observed during Pana Sankranti is Basundhara theki. A water filled earthen pot with a small hole at the end is placed at the top of the holy basil plant, so that water keeps dripping on the plant.

Local celebrations

Ghantapatuas are traditional male folk artistes from the Odisha that perform the art form "Jhama nata" during Pana Sankranti. They generally perform in a group of two or four wearing dresses that resemble women's clothing.

Danda nata that is performed during this festival celebration is one of the most ancient forms of performance art of the region. The opening ritual begins in the middle of Chaitra (March – April). The performers, also known as Dandua, take dip in a village pond and walk/run over hot charcoals while performing the art. After performing  they also perform  by dipping themselves in deep water for a short while. These performances symbolize the liberation from physical pain. A notable climax of the social celebrations is fire-walk, where volunteers sprint over a bed of burning coal while being cheered with music and songs.

Related holidays
This new year day is celebrated elsewhere across South and Southeast Asia which follow the related Hindu-Buddhist solar calendar traditions of South and Southeast Asian solar New Year (Mesha Sankranti and Songkran). The same day every year is also the new year for many Buddhist communities in parts of southeast Asia such as Myanmar, Sri Lanka and Cambodia, likely an influence of their shared culture in the 1st millennium CE. Some examples include:

Vaisakhi in North India and Nepal
Pohela Boishakh in states of West Bengal and Bangladesh
Bohag Bihu in Assam
Jur Sital in Mithila
Puthandu in Tamil Nadu
Vishu in Kerala
Aluth Avuruthu in Sri Lanka
Songkran in Thailand
Chol Chnam Thmey in Cambodia
Pi Mai Lao in Laos
Thingyan in Burma

However, this is not the universal new year for all Hindus. For many others who follow the Lunar calendar, the new year falls on Chaitra Navaratri, Ugadi, Gudi Padwa etc, which falls a few weeks earlier. For some, such as those in and near Gujarat, the new year festivities coincide during the five day Diwali festival.

See also
Chandaneswar, Shiva temple in Odisha, India

References

Further reading
 

Festivals in Odisha
New Year in India
April observances
Odia culture
Culture of Odisha
Hindu festivals